On 8 June 1998, rebels affiliated with the armed group Allied Democratic Front (ADF) attacked the Kichwamba Technical Institute in Kabarole, Uganda and set three dormitories on fire, killing 80 students. The ADF abducted another 100 students and destroyed other property including laboratories and school vehicles.

With the help of the Government of Uganda, the Netherlands Organisation for International Cooperation in Higher Education (Nuffic), Hanze University, Kyambogo University, Mountains of the Moon University and the Government of the Netherlands, the college has recovered and increased the student population to over 650, as at 2010.

See also
 List of massacres in Uganda
 Human rights in Uganda

References

1998 murders in Africa
Allied Democratic Forces
June 1998 crimes
June 1998 events in Africa
Massacres in Uganda
Massacres in 1998
School massacres
School fires
Arson in the 1990s
Attacks on schools in Africa